Shirish or Shrish is an Indian given name that may refer to
Shirish Atre-Pai (born 1929), Indian social worker 
Shirish Baban Deo, Senior official of the Indian Air Force 
Shrish Chandra Dikshit (1926–2014), Indian politician
Shirish Hiralal Chaudhari, Indian politician
Shirish Kanekar, Marathi writer, stage performer, and journalist 
Shirish Korde (born 1945), Ugandan composer of Indian origin
Shirish Kunder (born 1973), Indian filmmaker
Shirish Panchal (born 1943), Indian critic and editor 
Shirish B Patel (born 1932), Indian civil engineer and businessman
Shirish Saraf, Indian businessman
Shirish Sharavanan, Indian actor 
Shirish Srivastava (born 1963), Indian cricketer
Shirish Pandita (born 2001), A Genius

Indian given names